Aleksandr Aleksandrovich Volkov (born 14 February 1985) is a Russian volleyball player, a member of Russia men's national volleyball team and Russian club Zenit Kazan. He was 2012 Olympic Champion, bronze medalist of the 2008 Olympic Games, gold medalist of the 2011 World Cup, silver medalist of the 2007 European Championship, multimedalist of the World League.

Biography 
With Dynamo Moscow he won the bronze medal at the Men's CEV Champions League 2006–07 and was awarded the Final Four "Best Blocker".

Volkov competed at the 2008 Summer Olympics, where Russia claimed the bronze medal.  He and the Russian Team won the gold medal at the 2012 Summer Olympics in London.

Sporting achievements

Clubs

CEV Champions League
  2006/2007 - with Dynamo Moscow
  2009/2010 - with Dynamo Moscow
  2011/2012 - with Zenit Kazan
  2012/2013 - with Zenit Kazan
  2014/2015 - with Zenit Kazan

FIVB Club World Championship
  2011 Qatar - with Zenit Kazan

National championships
 2003/2004  Russian Championship, with Dynamo Moscow
 2005/2006  Russian Cup, with Dynamo Moscow
 2005/2006  Russian Championship, with Dynamo Moscow
 2006/2007  Russian Championship, with Dynamo Moscow
 2007/2008  Russian Cup, with Dynamo Moscow
 2007/2008  Russian Championship, with Dynamo Moscow
 2009/2010  Russian Championship, with Dynamo Moscow
 2010/2011  Italian SuperCup 2010, with Piemonte Volley
 2010/2011  Italian Cup, with Piemonte Volley
 2010/2011  Italian Championship, with Piemonte Volley
 2011/2012  Russian SuperCup 2011, with Zenit Kazan
 2011/2012  Russian Championship, with Zenit Kazan
 2012/2013  Russian Championship, with Zenit Kazan
 2012/2013  Russian SuperCup 2012, with Zenit Kazan
 2013/2014  Russian Championship, with Zenit Kazan
 2014/2015  Russian Championship, with Zenit Kazan
 2014/2015  Russian Cup, with Zenit Kazan

National team
 2007  FIVB World League
 2007  CEV European Championship
 2007  FIVB World Cup
 2008  FIVB World League
 2008  Olympic Games
 2009  FIVB World League
 2010  FIVB World League
 2011  FIVB World League
 2011  FIVB World Cup
 2012  Olympic Games

Individually
 2007 CEV Champions League - Best Blocker
 2009 CEV European Championship - Best Spiker
 2011 Italian SuperCup - Most Valuable Player
 2011 Memorial of Hubert Jerzy Wagner - Best Server

References

External links

 
 
 

1985 births
Living people
Russian men's volleyball players
Volleyball players at the 2008 Summer Olympics
Olympic volleyball players of Russia
Olympic bronze medalists for Russia
Olympic medalists in volleyball
Volleyball players at the 2012 Summer Olympics
Olympic gold medalists for Russia
Medalists at the 2012 Summer Olympics
Medalists at the 2008 Summer Olympics
Sportspeople from Moscow
Volleyball players at the 2016 Summer Olympics
VC Zenit Saint Petersburg players
Ural Ufa volleyball players